The Pipestone County Courthouse, located at 416 South Hiawatha in the city of Pipestone, Pipestone County in the U.S. state of Minnesota is a Beaux Arts style building featuring a Renaissance dome on a clock tower with heavily rusticated masonry and Sioux quartzite. A bronze Lady Justice stands on the dome. The interior is finished with elaborate oak woodwork. A multicolored mantle in the foyer was constructed from pipestone in a Native American motif. The building was constructed by C.H. Peltier of Faribault for $45,175.

References

Beaux-Arts architecture in Minnesota
Buildings and structures in Pipestone County, Minnesota
Clock towers in Minnesota
County courthouses in Minnesota
Courthouses on the National Register of Historic Places in Minnesota
Government buildings completed in 1901
National Register of Historic Places in Pipestone County, Minnesota
1901 establishments in Minnesota